Michael Leunig (born 2 June 1945), typically referred to as Leunig (his signature on his cartoons), is an Australian cartoonist. His works include The Curly Pyjama Letters, cartoon books The Essential Leunig, The Wayward Leunig, The Stick, Goatperson, Short Notes from the Long History of Happiness and Curly Verse, among others and The Lot, a compilation of his 'Curly World' newspaper columns. Leunig has also written a book of prayers, When I Talk To You.

He was declared an Australian Living Treasure by the National Trust of Australia in 1999.

Life and career 
Leunig, a fifth generation Australian, was born in East Melbourne and grew up in Footscray, an inner western suburb, where he went to Footscray North Primary School. He then went to Maribyrnong High School, but as the school had not finished being built, he first had to attend classes held at the nearby Royal Melbourne Showgrounds in Ascot Vale. He failed his final year examinations, twice.

After working as a labourer in an abattoir, Leunig enrolled at the Swinburne Film and Television School, where he was at first interested in making documentaries. He was conscripted in the Vietnam War call-up, but he registered as a conscientious objector; he was rejected on health grounds when it was revealed that he was deaf in one ear.

Leunig began his cartoon career while at Swinburne in 1965 when his cartoons appeared in the Monash University student newspaper Lot's Wife. In the early 1970s his work appeared in the radical/satirical magazines Nation Review, The Digger, and London's Oz magazine, as well as mainstream publications including Newsday and Woman's Day.

The main outlet for Leunig's work has been the daily Fairfax Media newspapers, Melbourne's The Age and The Sydney Morning Herald. The Australian Broadcasting Corporation has also provided airtime to Leunig to discuss his views on a range of political and philosophical issues.

Cartoons 
Leunig's drawings are done with a sparse and quivering line, usually in black and white with ink wash; the human characters are always drawn with exaggerated noses. This style served him well in his early years, when he gained a loyal following for his quirky take on social issues. He also made increasingly frequent forays into a personal fantasy world of whimsy, featuring small figures with teapots balanced on their heads, grotesquely curled hair and many ducks.

Leunig has frequently satirised concepts such as Americanisation, greed, consumerism, corporations and warmongering, in a personal proclamation against the War on Terror. Readers and critics took special note of his parodies of political matters, especially those concerning former Australian prime minister John Howard and former American president George W. Bush. These have earned Leunig a description as a "political cartoonist", although only some of his works are political in nature or reference.

His work has also frequently explored spiritual, religious and moral themes.

Controversial works 

Leunig's cartoons have occasionally been a source of controversy. In 2008, he wrote that "Artists must never shrink from a confrontation with society or the state."

Between 1995 and 2000, he drew the ire of working mothers by satirising the heavy reliance upon childcare services in Australian culture in several of his works.

Leunig opposed the 2003 invasion of Iraq commenting that "if a cartoonist is representing the government line on Iraq, they're nothing better than a propagandist".

In 2006, Fairfax Media censored a cartoon in New South Wales, but not in Victoria, which criticised the then prime minister, John Howard.

Leunig has also stated his opposition to the Israeli government. Three of his 2004–2006 cartoons drew letters of protest nationally and internationally. The three pieces took as their subjects: IDF bomber pilots (13 April 2004); Sheikh Ahmed Yassin's assassination order from Ariel Sharon (11 January 2006); and the renewed Gaza occupation (12 July 2006). A fourth piece was refused publication and has since been more widely criticised for potentially confounding his opposition to the policies of Israel with an antisemitic, generalised subversion of the Jewish experience, by relying upon a reference to the Jewish Holocaust. This cartoon came to international attention after it was entered in an Iranian competition conceived by the newspaper Hamshahri as retaliation for the Muhammad cartoons controversy. Leunig denied he had submitted the cartoon as an entry to the competition and said "I've been set up horribly, maliciously." He demanded that his cartoon be withdrawn; the newspaper did this and also apologised to him. It later emerged that the cartoon had been submitted as a prank by Richard Cooke, a web contributor to the Australian comedic team The Chaser.

Leunig has partially defined his position with this statement:

In September 2021, Leunig's cartoon contributions for the editorial page in the Monday edition of The Age newspaper in Melbourne were ended following the paper's rejection for publication of a cartoon he had drawn in response to COVID-19 vaccination requirements in Australia. The cartoon compared resistance to vaccine requirements to the Tank Man in Tiananmen Square. He continues to contribute cartoons for the Saturday edition of The Age and The Sydney Morning Herald.

Characters and themes
In the series of cartoons that Leunig has created over the duration of his career, a number of characters have persistently appeared, including:
 The Duck
 Mr Curly – a contented character who is at ease in the natural world
Vasco Pyjama – a restless wanderer who sometimes seeks the counsel of Mr Curly

Leunig has, from a very early stage in his career, often included his own handwritten poetry within his cartoons; subsequently he has also published books of poetry. He has been very open about his themes, in interviews about his work.

Personal life 
Leunig's first marriage, to Pamela Munro, ended in divorce. He married his second wife, Helga, in 1992 but separated in the 2010s. A film documentary about his life by Kasimir Burgess, The Leunig Fragments, was released in 2020 and reveals various difficulties that Leunig has experienced with family relationships. He did not attend his parents' funerals and is not in regular contact with his siblings. His four children were all born on notable dates: Gus on Guy Fawkes Day 1974, Sunny on Valentine's Day 1980, Minna on Australia Day 1992 and Felix on Christmas Day 1994. All of his children were homeschooled.

His sister, Mary Leunig (b. 1950), is also an accomplished cartoonist.

Leunig has a studio in Northcote, Melbourne, and a property in north-east Victoria.

Honours and celebrity 

1999 – Leunig was declared an Australian Living Treasure by the National Trust of Australia
There has been a Melbourne tram decorated with his cartoon characters
2006 – Leunig featured strongly at the opening ceremony of the 2006 Melbourne Commonwealth Games. In the performance, the philosophical and mystical nature of his work was on display. It featured a "boy and his duck" and the boy's dreams and visions. Leunig was heard reading a stanza of his poem as a voice-over.
Leunig was the creator of a popular iGoogle theme.
2016 – Metrosideros leunigii, the oldest described fossil species of the flowering plant genus Metrosideros, was named after Leunig.

Collaboration with Gyan
In 2006 Australian musician Gyan Evans released the album Billy the Rabbit, which was based on the poetry of Leunig. Gyan and Leunig launched the album at the Melbourne Writers Festival, with Leunig illustrating during Gyan's singing. They also performed together at the Byron Bay Writers Festival and the Sydney Opera House.

Published works 
Collections of press cartoons and original art and/or poems

 The Penguin Leunig (1974) (40th anniversary reissue 2014)
 The Second Leunig: a Dusty Little Swag (1979)
 The Bedtime Leunig (1981)
 A Bag of Roosters (1983)
 Ramming the Shears (1985)
 The Travelling Leunig (1990)
 A Common Prayer (1990)
 The Prayer Tree (1990)
 Introspective (1991)
 A Common Philosophy (1992)
 Everyday Devils and Angels (1992)
 A Bunch of Poesy (1992)
 You and Me (1995)
 Short Notes from the Long History of Happiness (1996)
 Why Dogs Sniff Each Other's Tails (1998)
 Goatperson and Other Tales (1999)
 Carnival of the Animals (2000)
 The Curly Pyjama Letters (2001)
 The Stick and Other Tales of our Times (2002)
 Poems (2003)
 Kicking Behinds (2003)
 Strange Creature (2003)
 Wild Figments (2004)
 A New Penguin Leunig (2005)
 Hot and Bothered (2007)
 The Lot: in Words (2008)
 When I Talk to You (2014)
 Musings from the Inner Duck (2015)Multi-decade compilations' Poems: 1972-2002 (2003 hardback) later Curly Verse: Selected Poems (2010 paperback)
 The Essential Leunig: Cartoons from a Winding Path (2012)
 Holy Fool: Artworks (2014)
 The Wayward Leunig (2015)

 Works in the Australian National Bibliographic database 

 The Animated Leunig (videorecording) (c2001)
 A bag of roosters / Michael Leunig (1983)
 The bedtime Leunig / Michael Leunig *1981, 
 A bunch of poesy / Leunig (1992)
 A celebration: Michael Leunig / Friends of the National Library of Australia (1997)
 A common prayer / Leunig (1990)
 A common prayer / Leunig (1993)
 A common prayer : a cartoonist talks to God / Leunig (1998)
 A conversation between Michael Leunig and Terry Laidler ... (1997)
 The curly pyjama letters / Michael Leunig (2001)
 The curly pyjama letters / Michael Leunig (2006)
 English in heat / Morris Lurie, drawings by Leunig (1972)
 Everyday devils and angels / Michael Leunig (1992)
 Goatperson and other tales / Michael Leunig (1999)
 The happy prints: printmaking / Michael Leunig (1998)
 Introspective / Michael Leunig, with foreword by Helen Garner (1988)
 Introspective / Michael Leunig ; with a foreword by Helen Garner (1991)
 Leunig's Carnival of the animals / Michael Leunig, Peter Garrett, Richard Tognetti and the Australian Chamber Orchestra (2000)
 A new Penguin Leunig / Michael Leunig (1992)
 A new Penguin Leunig / Michael Leunig (2005)
 The Penguin Leunig: cartoons / by Michael Leunig, introduced by Barry Humphries (1974)
 Poems 1972–2002 / Michael Leunig (2003)
 The prayer tree / Leunig (1991)
 The prayer tree / Leunig (1998)
 Ramming the shears: a collection of drawings / Michael Leunig (1985)
 Ramming the shears: a collection of drawings / Michael Leunig (1990)
 The second Leunig, a dusty little swag: cartoons, a few verses and selected moments from the voyage of Vasco Pyjama / by Michael Leunig (1979)
 Short notes from the long history of happiness / Michael Leunig (1996)
 The stick : and other tales of our times / Michael Leunig (2002)
 The stick : and other tales of our times / Michael Leunig (2006, 
 Strange creature / Michael Leunig (2003)
 The travelling Leunig: cartoons / by Michael Leunig (1990)
 Why dogs sniff each other's tails : an old but true story / Michael Leunig (1998)
 Wild figments / Michael Leunig (2004)
 You and me: a collection of recent pictures, verses, fables, aphorisms and songs / Michael Leunig (1995)

References

External links

Video: Michael Leunig in conversation with Jane Sullivan, Writers at the Convent, February 2009
Interview with Michael Leunig, Enough Rope with Andrew Denton, 2006
Today's cartoon in Melbourne's The Age (not always a Leunig cartoon)
Feature – Michael Leunig, 27 June 2004, The Age''
One Plus One - Michael Leunig, Australian Broadcasting Corporation, December 2017

1945 births
Living people
APRA Award winners
Writers from Melbourne
Cartoonists from Melbourne
Australian people of German descent
Australian conscientious objectors
Australian editorial cartoonists
Swinburne University of Technology alumni
Ducks in literature
People from Footscray, Victoria